Kim Jo-guk is a North Korean politician.

Biography
He is a member of the Central Committee of the Workers' Party of Korea and a member of the Central Military Commission of the Workers’ Party of Korea. Since 2019 he is serving as first deputy head of the Organization and Guidance Department. At the time of Hwang Sun-hui's death in January 2020, he served as a member of the funeral committee. In May 2020, he attended the 4th Enlarged meeting of the 7th plenary session of the Central Military Commission and the 20th Politburo meeting of the 7th Central Committee in November 2020. During the 8th Congress of the WPK he was elected full member of the 8th Central Committee.

References

North Korean politicians
Members of the 8th Central Committee of the Workers' Party of Korea

ko:김조국